Ravishankar K. Iyer (born 1949, New Delhi) is the George and Ann Fisher Distinguished Professor of Engineering at the University of Illinois at Urbana-Champaign. He is a specialist in reliable and secure networks and systems.

Biography 
Iyer received his BA and Ph.D. Degrees from the University of Queensland in 1970 and 1977 respectively. He then went to Stanford University on a CSIRO Fellowship. After four years at Stanford, he moved to the University of Illinois at Urbana-Champaign.

Professor Iyer leads the DEPEND Group at CSL, with a multidisciplinary focus on systems and software that combine deep measurement-driven analytics and machine learning with applications in two important domains: i) trust (that spans resilience and the security of critical infrastructures) and ii) health (that spans computational genomics and health analytics focused on personalized medicine). The Depend Group has developed a rich AI analytics framework that has been deployed on real-world applications in collaborations with industry, health providers, and government agencies including NSF, NIH, and DoD.

Professor Iyer is a Fellow of the American Association for the Advancement of Science (AAAS), the Institute of Electrical and Electronics Engineers (IEEE), and the Association for Computing Machinery (ACM). He has received several awards, including the IEEE Emanuel R. Piore Award, and the 2011 Outstanding Contributions award by the Association of Computing Machinery. Professor Iyer is also the recipient of the degree of Doctor Honoris Causa from Toulouse Sabatier University in France.

Academic work
He holds joint appointments in the Department of Electrical and Computer Engineering, the Coordinated Science Laboratory (CSL), the Department of Computer Science, the National Center for Supercomputing Applications, the Carle Illinois College of Medicine, and the Carl R. Woese Institute for Genomic Biology. He also serves as Director of the Center for Reliable and High-Performance Computing at Illinois and as Chief Scientist of the Information Trust Institute. He is also a faculty Research Affiliate at the Mayo Clinic, and a Yeoh Ghin Seng Distinguished Visiting Professor of the National University Health System, Singapore. Previously, he was the Director of the Coordinated Science Laboratory. He was the Interim Vice-Chancellor for Research from 2008-2011.

He was the institutional lead and is a technical area lead on Illinois’ Blue Waters Petascale project funded by a $200M NSF grant.

Research 
Iyer’s research contributions have led to major advances in the design and validation of dependable computing systems.  He has authored or co-authored close to three hundred refereed publications, graduated over 35 PhD students and many Masters students.  His students and postdoctoral associates have gone on to successful leadership positions at major industrial laboratories, faculty positions at major universities world-wide and founded several successful startups acquired by major vendors.   He has led several large successful projects including the NASA’s Center for Excellence in Aerospace Computing, DARPA multi-university program in advanced reliable computing and the creation of the Information Trust Institute.  During his tenure as Director of CSL the research expenditures in the laboratory went from $6.5M to nearly $18M.  He currently leads the Trusted Illiac project at Illinois.  Funded by both industry and government, the project is developing adaptive, application-aware architectures supporting a wide range of dependability and security requirements.

He has consulted with and advised  major vendors such as IBM, HP, Motorola, SUN, Huawei and Infosys Technologies and government  agencies like, DARPA, NASA, the DoD, JPL and CNRS-LAAS;  He currently leads the University’s effort to create unique corporate funded offices in India and China. Iyer is the founder of Armored Computing a profitable Illinois company with worldwide customers including Honeywell, Motorola, Ansaldo Corporation and Huawei.

Awards and honors

Iyer is a Fellow of the American Association for the Advancement of Science, the IEEE, and the ACM. He has received several awards, including the Humboldt Foundation Senior Distinguished Scientist Award for excellence in research and teaching, the AIAA Information Systems Award and Medal for “fundamental and pioneering contributions towards the design, evaluation, and validation of dependable aerospace computing systems,” the IEEE Emanuel R. Piore Award for fundamental contributions to measurement, evaluation, and design of reliable computing systems, and the 2011 Outstanding Contributions award by the Association of Computing Machinery (ACM)- Special Interest Group on Security and Audit (SIGSAC) for his fundamental and far-reaching contributions in secure and dependable computing systems. Professor Iyer is also the recipient of the degree of Doctor Honaris Causa from France’s Toulouse Sabatier University in recognition of his outstanding research contributions in dependable computing and for his extensive collaboration with CNRS/LAAS in Toulouse.

References

External links
 Ravishankar K. Iyer's Homepage
 DEPEND Research Group's Homepage

Living people
1949 births